Jiří Žemba (17 November 1939 – 31 July 1981) was a Czech athlete. He competed in the men's discus throw at the 1964 Summer Olympics.

References

External links
 

1939 births
1981 deaths
Athletes (track and field) at the 1964 Summer Olympics
Czech male discus throwers
Olympic athletes of Czechoslovakia
Sportspeople from Třebíč
Universiade medalists in athletics (track and field)
Universiade silver medalists for Czechoslovakia